Salvia nipponica is a perennial plant that is native to Japan and Taiwan. The  flowers have many hairs, with a yellow corolla that has a red spot.

Notes

nipponica
Flora of Taiwan